I'm Not Easy is a studio album by American country artist Billie Jo Spears. It was released in November 1976 via United Artists Records and contained 11 tracks. The disc featured many ballads, along with some uptempo tracks. Of its tracks, two singles were spawned: "Never Did Like Whiskey" and the title track. Both reached top 20 positions on the American country charts between 1976 and 1977. The disc itself charted on the American country albums chart and received mainly positive reviews from music publications.

Background, recording and content
Billie Jo Spears first had success with 1969's "Mr. Walker, It's All Over", but really broke through in 1975 with the chart-topping "Blanket on the Ground". The song set forth a series of top ten and top 20 singles that Spears had through 1980. The United Artists label would also issue a series of studio albums of Spears's material during the decade, including 1976's I'm Not Easy. The project was recorded in July 1976 at the Jack Clement Recording Studio in Nashville, Tennessee. Sessions were produced by Larry Butler.

I'm Not Easy consisted of 11 tracks. Several songs on the project were both ballads and cover tunes. This included Elvis Presley's "Heartbreak Hotel" and two Dottie West covers: "Here Comes My Baby Back Again" and "Every Word I Write". Also featured are covers of Barbara Mandrell's single "That's What Friends Are For" and a song that first appeared on an album by Tammy Wynette titled "Too Far Gone". Original songs on the project included the title track, "Never Did Like Whiskey", "No Other Man" and "Is I Love You That Easy to Say".

Release and critical reception

I'm Not Easy was released by United Artists Records in October 1976. It was originally distributed as a vinyl LP with five songs on each side of the disc. It was the eleventh studio album of Spears's career. The album received mostly positive reviews from critics and music publications. Billboard magazine commented that "Spears scores an impressive performance" with each track. They also praised the album's production: "Each selection is tackled in a fresh, powerful and heartfelt manner." Cashbox magazine positively commented, "Billie Jo makes each her own distinctive, message, with production by Larry Butler." 

AllMusic's Greg Adams rated I'm Not Easy four out of five stars. "A lot of big names contributed to this album in one way or another, but in the end it is the performances of Spears that elevate I'm Not Easy above the fray," he concluded. Alan Cackett of Country Music People magazine gave the project a less favorable review in 1978: "Containing as it did three hit singles, you would think that this would have been a great album, but it featured disappointingly poor versions of songs made famous by others."

Chart performance and singles
I'm Not Easy debuted on America's Billboard Top Country Albums chart in December 1976. It spent a total of 13 weeks on the chart, climbing to the number 36 position in January 1977. It was among Spears's final top 40 chart entries on the Country Albums survey. Two singles were spawned from I'm Not Easy. The first was "Never Did Like Whiskey", which United Artists first issued in October 1976. It reached the top 20 of the American Billboard Hot Country Songs chart, peaking at number 18. On Canada's RPM Country Tracks chart, it reached number 28. The title track was then spawned as the second single in January 1977. It later reached number 11 on the Billboard country chart and number 29 on the RPM Country Tracks chart.

Track listing

Personnel
All credits are adapted from the liner notes of I'm Not Easy.

Musical personnel
Tommy Allsup – Bass guitar
Byron Bach – Strings
Brenton Banks – Strings
George Binkley III – Strings
Larry Butler – Keyboards
Jimmy Capps – Guitar
Jerry Carrigan – Drums
Marvin Chantry – Strings
Roy Christensen – Strings
Jimmy Colvard – Guitar
Pete Drake – Steel guitar

Jack Eubanks – Guitar
Carl Gorodetzky – Strings
Sheldon Kurland – Strings
Bob Moore – Bass
George Richey – Keyboards
Hargus "Pig" Robbins – Keyboards
Billy Sanford – Guitar
Pam Sixfin – Strings
Steven Smith – Strings
Billie Jo Spears – Lead vocals
Gary Vanosdale – Strings
Pete Wade – Guitar

Technical personnel
Larry Butler – Producer
Bill Burks – Design
Bill Justis – String arrangement
The Jordanaires – Background vocals
Ria Lewerke – Art direction
Carol Montgomery – Background vocals
Gary Regester – Photography
Billy Sherrill – Engineer
Bob Sowell – Mastering

Chart performance

Release history

References

1977 albums
Albums arranged by Bill Justis
Albums produced by Larry Butler (producer)
Billie Jo Spears albums
United Artists Records albums